Best-selling albums of all-time in Indonesia

These are the top 15 best-selling albums in Indonesia by Indoneisan artists, according to physical sales.

These are the top best-selling albums in Indonesia by international artists.

See also
List of Indonesian musicians and musical groups

References

Indonesia